In enzymology, a dimethylglycine dehydrogenase is an enzyme that catalyzes the chemical reaction

N,N-dimethylglycine + acceptor + H2O  sarcosine + formaldehyde + reduced acceptor

The 3 substrates of this enzyme are N,N-dimethylglycine, acceptor, and H2O, whereas its 3 products are sarcosine, formaldehyde, and reduced acceptor.

This enzyme belongs to the family of oxidoreductases, specifically those acting on the CH-NH group of donors with other acceptors.  The systematic name of this enzyme class is N,N-dimethylglycine:acceptor oxidoreductase (demethylating). Other names in common use include N,N-dimethylglycine oxidase, and N,N-dimethylglycine:(acceptor) oxidoreductase (demethylating).  This enzyme participates in glycine, serine and threonine metabolism.  It employs one cofactor, FAD.

References

 
 

EC 1.5.8
Flavoproteins
Enzymes of unknown structure